The Port of Barrow refers to the enclosed dock system within the town of Barrow-in-Furness, England. Morecambe Bay is to the east of the port and the Irish Sea surrounds it to the south and west. The port is currently owned and operated by Associated British Ports Holdings, but some land is shared with BAE Systems Submarine Solutions. Currently consisting of four large docks, the Port of Barrow is one of North West England's most important ports. The docks are as follows: Buccleuch Dock, Cavendish Dock, Devonshire Dock and Ramsden Dock. The port of Barrow is the only deep water port between the Mersey and the Clyde.

Barrow shipyard is one of the largest in the United Kingdom (it has built well over 800 vessels in its history), rivalled only by those in Belfast, Birkenhead and Govan. It is also home to the country's only submarine production facility. The port is heavily involved with the transportation of natural gases and other forms of energy from local sites such as Sellafield, Barrow Offshore Windfarm, Ormonde Wind Farm, Rampside Gas Terminal and Roosecote Power Station. Barrow is also becoming increasingly popular as a port of call for cruise liners visiting the town and the Lake District. James Fisher & Sons are the main company to operate out of the port.

History

Barrow has a long and complex history of shipbuilding and maritime trade. In the late 19th century, the town had the largest steelworks on Earth, and the Port of Barrow was the main route used to transport the steel produced in the town. Historically, the Port of Barrow and BAE cover a large area, so that Barrow is one of the country's largest shipbuilding centres. Hundreds of warships, aircraft carriers, cruise liners, ferries and submarines have been constructed in Barrow, which remains the only operational submarine production facility in the UK. The port's busiest year was 1956, when 1,155,076 tonnes of iron ore alone were exported.

In 1839 Henry Schneider arrived at Barrow-in-Furness as a young speculator and dealer in iron, and in 1850 he discovered large deposits of haematite. He and other investors founded the Furness Railway, the first section of which opened in 1846 to transport the ore from the slate quarries at Kirkby-in-Furness and haematite mines at Lindal-in-Furness to a deep water harbour near Roa Island. The docks built between 1867 and 1881 in the more sheltered channel between the mainland and Barrow Island replaced the port at Roa Island. The increasing quantities of iron ore mined in Furness were then brought to Barrow to be transported by sea. The sheltered strait between Barrow and Walney Island was an ideal location for the shipyard. The first ship to be built, Jane Roper, was launched in 1852; the first steamship, a 3,000-ton liner named Duke of Devonshire, in 1873. Shipbuilding activity increased, and on 18 February 1871 the Barrow Shipbuilding Company was incorporated. Barrow's relative isolation from the United Kingdom's industrial heartlands meant that the newly-formed company included several capabilities that would usually be subcontracted to other establishments. In particular, a large engineering works was constructed, including a foundry and pattern shop, a forge, and an engine shop. In addition, the shipyard had a joiners' shop, a boat-building shed and a sailmaking and rigging loft.

The Barrow Shipbuilding Company was taken over by the Sheffield steel firm of Vickers in 1897, by which time the shipyard had surpassed the railway and steelworks as the largest employer and landowner in Barrow. The company constructed Vickerstown, modelled on George Cadbury's Bournville, on the adjacent Walney Island in the early 20th century to house its employees. It also commissioned Sir Edwin Lutyens to design Abbey House as a guest house and residence for its managing director, Commander Craven. By the 1890s the shipyard was heavily engaged in the construction of warships for the Royal Navy and also for export. The Royal Navy's first submarine, was built in 1901, and by 1914 the UK had the most advanced submarine fleet in the world, with 94% of it constructed by Vickers. During World War II, Barrow was a target for the German Air Force looking to disable the town's shipbuilding capabilities (see Barrow Blitz). Barrow's industry continued to supply the war effort. Winston Churchill once visited the town to launch the aircraft carrier . After a rapid decline in the town's steel industry, shipbuilding quickly became Barrow's largest and most important industry. From the 1960s onwards it concentrated its efforts in submarine manufacture, and the UK's first nuclear-powered submarine,  was constructed in 1960.

The end of the Cold War in 1991 marked a reduction in the demand for military ships and submarines, and the town continued its decline. The shipyard's dependency on military contracts at the expense of civilian and commercial engineering and shipbuilding meant it was particularly hard hit as government defence spending was reduced dramatically. The workforce shrank from 14,500 in 1990 to 5,800 in February 1995. The rejection by the VSEL management of detailed plans for Barrow's industrial renewal in the mid-to-late 1980s remains controversial. This has led to interest in the possibilities of converting military-industrial production in declining shipbuilding areas to the offshore renewable energy sector.

The port today

Exports and imports
The port of Barrow has seen a big decrease in trade since steel production in the town halted; but many local businesses rely heavily on the port to import and export goods. Some 41,000 tonnes of wood pulp per year are now imported here from Flushing, Netherlands, and  transported to the larger Kimberly-Clark plant in Ormsgill. The port of Barrow also exports locally quarried limestone to parts of Scandinavia to be used in the paper industry and in the production of industrial gases. There is also a well-established rail link which was originally built as part of the Furness Line.

The port plays a major role in the region's energy production. British Gas Hydrocarbon Resources Limited operates a condensate-storage site in Ramsden Dock, through which the liquid by-product of gas production at the nearby Rampside Gas Terminal is exported. The PNTL vessel Pacific Heron is based at the port of Barrow, and is used to transport nuclear material between nearby Sellafield and Japan. The port also played an important role in the construction of the Barrow Offshore Wind Farm, which was completed in 2006. Resources and materials were stored at the dock before being shipped to the wind farm site on Morecambe Bay. The turbines and energy produced are still strongly associated with the port. They also own a multi-purpose vessel, Furness Abbey, which is available for hire. There are many cranes in Barrow's dockland. The majority are owned by BAE, and ABP only operates one 120-tonne quayside crane. The maximum dimensions of vessels that can dock in Barrow are  length by  beam and  draught.

Cruise ships

Barrow itself has relatively few nearby tourist spots (Furness Abbey, South Lakes Safari Zoo and the Dock Museum), but it is quite close to the Lake District, and has been nicknamed "The Gateway to the Lakes". Barrow is the principal port serving Cumbria and the Lake District, and has been a port of call for several cruise ships in recent years. A new purpose-built cruise ship terminal alongside Walney Channel was proposed as part of the multi-million pound waterfront development (see the 'Future' heading). This was subsequently removed from the plans.

Future

Gallery

See also
 The Waterfront Barrow-in-Furness
 Barrow-in-Furness
 List of seaports
 List of ships and submarines built in Barrow-in-Furness

Companies associated with the port
 Associated British Ports Holdings
 James Fisher & Sons
 BAE Systems Submarine Solutions
 Vickers Shipbuilding and Engineering
 Vickers-Armstrongs
 Kimberly-Clark
 BNFL
 DONG Energy
 Centrica

References

External links
 

Port of Barrow
Barrow-in-Furness